Vieja maculicauda also known as the blackbelt cichlid, is a cichlid fish species native to Central America from Southern Mexico to Panama.

References

maculicauda
Taxa named by Charles Tate Regan
Fish described in 1905